The Indian Valley Mine is a historic quartz mine located at 27301 Seward Highway (mile marker 104) within the community of Indian in the Municipality of Anchorage, Alaska, between the main area of Anchorage and the city of Seward on the north shore of Turnagain Arm.  The quartz vein was discovered in 1910 by Peter Strong, who had come to Alaska in 1898 during the Klondike Gold Rush, and had previously staked a small gold claim in the area. Strong worked this claim through the 1920s and 1930s, building a cabin and an assay house that are the oldest known buildings in the Turnagain Arm region.

The mine was listed on the National Register of Historic Places in 1989. It is now a tourist attraction that is open seven days a week during the summer season (mid-May to mid-September).

See also
 Indian, Anchorage
 National Register of Historic Places listings in Anchorage, Alaska

References

External links
 Indian Valley Mine (official website)
 Indian Valley Mine (Facebook page)

Buildings and structures completed in 1920
Gold mining in Alaska
Historic districts on the National Register of Historic Places in Alaska
Industrial buildings and structures on the National Register of Historic Places in Alaska
Mining in Alaska
Buildings and structures on the National Register of Historic Places in Anchorage, Alaska